Abu Tahir Firuzshah, better known by his laqab of Diya' al-Dawla,  was the Buyid ruler of Basra during the 980s. He was the son of 'Adud al-Dawla.

History 
Abu Tahir Firuzshah was the son of Adud al-Dawla and a daughter of Manadhar, who was a Justanid king. Following 'Adud al-Dawla's death in 983, his possessions were divided between his sons. Samsam al-Dawla, who was the presumed successor of 'Adud al-Dawla, took power, but Sharaf al-Dawla took advantage of his position in Kerman to invade Fars. This invasion distracted Samsam al-Dawla and gave Abu Tahir Firuzshah the ability to set up his own independent rule in Basra, where he took the title of Diya' al-Dawla.

Diya' al-Dawla, as well as another brother, Taj al-Dawla, who controlled Khuzestan, eventually decided acknowledge the authority of Fakhr al-Dawla, who ruled in Jibal. This was done in an attempt to protect themselves from the conflict between Samsam al-Dawla and Sharaf al-Dawla; Basra and Khuzestan were situated in between the possessions of the two and were therefore vulnerable. Nevertheless, after a few years Sharaf al-Dawla invaded and occupied Basra and Khuzestan, causing the two princes to flee to Fakhr al-Dawla's territory. There they found refuge in Ray. Neither of the two brothers managed to found any lasting line; consequently their role in Buyid politics was short.

References
 

Fars
10th-century rulers in Asia
10th-century Iranian people